Basilio Fernando Air Base, or simply Fernando Air Base (formerly known as Lipa Air Base) is the site of the Philippine Air Force's (PAF) pilot training and education facilities located in the city of Lipa, Batangas, Philippines.

It is named after Lieutenant Colonel Basilio Fernando, who had died during an airplane training accident in the US.(one of the pioneers of the Philippine aviation) It is also the location of PAF Air Education, Training, and doctrine Command of the Philippine Air Force.

Throughout the years, it has been consistently awarded as the Philippine Air Force's Model Base of the Year for its well maintained appearance, excellent base services, aggressive ecological and environmental control, and consistent safety and security control.

Location
It is located in Lipa, Batangas, about 83 km SSE of Manila, Philippines.

History
The base was built by the U. S. Army prior to the Pacific War.

On December 22, 1941, the 27th Bombardment Group temporarily transferred its personnel to Lipa before departing on December 25 to Cabcaben Airfield.

During early 1942, it was occupied by elements of the Japanese Imperial Army 16th Division commanded by General Morioka. During the Japanese occupation, Lipa Airfield was repaired and expanded by the Japanese.

On 12 April 1948, the late President Manuel Roxas directed the renaming of Lipa Air Base to Fernando Field and subsequently, to Fernando Air Base in honor of Lt. Col. Basilio Fernando, one of the pioneers of Philippine aviation.

In 1952, Fernando Air Base became a training base called the 100th Training Wing where training units and other support units of the Philippine Air Force were grouped.

The base was used to train Philippine airmen. There were 3 different learning/training facilities on the base: The Air Force Flying School, the Technical Training Center, and the NCO Academy, which conducted continuing education for NCO's. These facilities were staffed with instructors from the 100th Training Wing until 22 September 1999, when the functions were subsumed by the Air Education and Training Command.

Facilities
 Officers and enlisted Personnel club houses,
 Fernando Air Base chapel
 Fernando Air Base hospital
 Athletic Facilities
 0.6 km Firing range
 Fernando Air Base 18-hole Golf Course

Air Education, Training, and Doctrine Command
It is one of the Major Commands of the Philippine Air Force. On 21 September 1999, the 100th Training Wing was deactivated and the Air Education and Training Command was established with a greater responsibility and wider scope of training task. On 2018, the capability to develop doctrines has been given to the Command with the designation of the Air Warfare Center under the command and control of the Command. Subsequently, it was renamed Air Education, Training, and Doctrine Command (AETDC).

Primary Units
The command is composed of seven (6) primary schools namely:
 PAF Officer School (responsible for preparing officers to assume positions of higher responsibility.)
 PAF Basic Military School (responsible for training soldier candidates.)
 PAF Non-Commissioned Officer School (responsible for conducting career courses for Enlisted Personnel.)
 PAF Flying School (responsible for conducting flying training to aviation students to qualify as pilots of the Air Force.)
 PAF Officer Candidate School (responsible for training officer candidates.)
 PAF Technical and Specialization School (responsible for conducting technical courses for all Air Force personnel.)
PAF Logistics Training Center (responsible for logistics related training) - located at Clark Air Base, Pampanga
It also houses PAF Aviation Leadership and Excellence Nexus responsible for developing PAF personnel at all levels to become leaders of character and excellence and the PAF Civilian Human Resource School responsible for professional education of PAF Civilian Human Resource.

Support units
Working with the primary units are four Support Units:
 550th Air Base Group (its mission is to manage, operate and maintain base facilities and to provide support services and security throughout the base.)
 440th Aircraft Maintenance Group (its mission is to perform, coordinate and supervise the operation of maintenance function.)
 Fernando Air Base Hospital (its mission is to provide hospitalization and outpatient services to military personnel, dependents and other authorized personnel.)
 1303rd Dental Dispensary (its mission is to provide dental services to mil personnel, dependents and authorized civilians.)

References

External links
 Philippine Air Force
 PAF Air Education and Training Command Website

Air force installations of the Philippines
Military education and training in the Philippines
Buildings and structures in Lipa, Batangas